Pudupatti may refer to:
Pudupatti, Thanjavur
Pudupatti, Tirunelveli
Pudupatti, Virudhunagar
R. Pudupatti, Namakkal
W. Pudupatti, Virudhunagar

See also
Pudupattinam (disambiguation)